Kim Elizabeth Giddens (born 30 December 1979) is an Australian politician. She has been an Australian Labor Party member of the Western Australian Legislative Assembly since 2021, representing the electoral district of Bateman.

Giddens studied politics and international relations at the University of New South Wales and education at Charles Darwin University. Prior to entering politics, Giddens was the principal policy advisor to state MP Peter Tinley. She had previously worked for the Tasmanian Government.

She was elected at the 2021 Western Australian state election with a 14.5% swing in the two-party-preferred vote, becoming the first Labor MP to represent the traditionally Liberal seat previously held by minister Dean Nalder.

References 

Living people
1979 births
Australian Labor Party members of the Parliament of Western Australia
Members of the Western Australian Legislative Assembly
Women members of the Western Australian Legislative Assembly
21st-century Australian politicians
21st-century Australian women politicians